Neptun may refer to:

Neptun, Romania, resort town on the southeast Black Sea coast of Romania
Neptun (radar), a World War II German radar set
SK Neptun, Swedish swim team
Neptunkryssare, a sailboat design

Ships 
 , a warship of the city of Zurich
 , steamboat that operated from 1865 to 1939 on Lake Constance
 , steamship that sank in 1880 in Lake Biel
 , passenger ship
 , combined cable-layer and tanker
 , a  commissioned in 1943 and decommissioned in 1966.
 , a  commissioned in 1980 and decommissioned in 1998. Now a museum ship.

See also
 Neptune (disambiguation)
 Neptuno (ship)